William Yates (1883 – after 1914), known as  was an English professional footballer who played as an inside forward in the Football League for Manchester United, in the Southern League for Brighton & Hove Albion, Portsmouth and Coventry City, and in the Scottish League for Heart of Midlothian.

Life and career
Yates was born in Birmingham, where he played local football before joining Aston Villa in 1903. He made one appearance for Villa's first team, and moved on after two years to Brighton & Hove Albion of the Southern League. He missed only one match in the 1905–06 Southern League season, and scored three goals as the team progressed to the second round proper (last 32) of that season's FA Cup, in which they lost to Middlesbrough after two replays.

During the close season, he and Frank Buckley were transferred to Manchester United of the Football League First Division. He made his debut on 15 September 1906 in a 2–0 win against Sheffield United, but played only twice more before moving on to the Scottish First Division with Heart of Midlothian in January 1907.

He spent a year in Scotland, scoring five goals from twelve league appearances and playing on the losing side in the 1907 Scottish Cup Final. becoming the first English man to play in a Scottish FA Cup final. According to the Glasgow Herald match report, "only [Bobby] Walker and Yates were effective forward" for Hearts.

Returning to England in January 1908, he spent three years apiece with Portsmouth and Coventry City, making more than 100 Southern League appearances for each. He retired because of injury in 1914, and went on to keep a pub in Coventry.

References 

1883 births
Year of death missing
Footballers from Birmingham, West Midlands
English footballers
Association football inside forwards
Aston Villa F.C. players
Brighton & Hove Albion F.C. players
Manchester United F.C. players
Heart of Midlothian F.C. players
Portsmouth F.C. players
Coventry City F.C. players
Southern Football League players
English Football League players
Date of birth missing
Place of death missing